Bhavan's College is a college located in Andheri West, a neighborhood in western Mumbai, India. It was established in 1946, a year before India gained independence from the British in 1947. K. M. Munshi was the founding president of the college.

Bhavan's College is a part of the Bharatiya Vidya Bhavan. The college is built upon  of land and has volleyball and basketball courts, football pitches, a botanical garden, a lake, a nature adventure centre, and a Lord Shiva temple within the campus. It primarily offers higher secondary (junior college) and undergraduate (bachelor's) courses. There a few postgraduate and PhD programs too.

References

External links 
 

Educational institutions established in 1946
Affiliates of the University of Mumbai
Universities and colleges in Mumbai
Universities and colleges affiliated with the Bharatiya Vidya Bhavan
1946 establishments in India
Colleges in India